Loxodonta atlantica is an extinct species of elephant in the genus Loxodonta, from Africa. It was larger than the modern African elephant, with more progressive dentition. It includes Pleistocene fossils from Ternifine, Middle Pleistocene fossils from Elandsfontein and Late Pliocene fossils from the Omo River, with a final dating in the Late Pleistocene. L. atlantica was said to probably derive from  L. adaurora; however, an analysis in 2009 suggested that L. atlantica evolved from L. exoptata, and is ancestral to L. africana. The species is divided into two subspecies: L. atlantica atlantica (northern Africa) and L. atlantica zulu (southern Africa). The type for Loxodonta atlantica is housed in the Muséum national d'histoire naturelle in Paris, but is listed without a specimen number.

References

Prehistoric elephants
Pliocene proboscideans
Pleistocene proboscideans
Pliocene first appearances
Pleistocene species extinctions
Pliocene mammals of Africa
Pleistocene mammals of Africa
Fossil taxa described in 1879